Darreh Shir or Darrehshir may refer to:
 Darreh Shir, Chaharmahal and Bakhtiari
 Darreh Shir, Kohgiluyeh and Boyer-Ahmad
 Darreh Shir, Yazd